Charles O'Conor, (1 January 1710 – 1 July 1791), also known as Charles O'Conor of Belanagare, was a member of the Gaelic nobility of Ireland and antiquarian who was enormously influential as a protagonist for the preservation of Irish culture and  Irish mythology during the 18th-century. He combined an encyclopaedic knowledge of Irish manuscripts and Gaelic culture in demolishing many specious theories and suppositions concerning Irish history. 

O'Conor was an activist for Catholic Emancipation during the eighteenth century. He worked relentlessly, first for the relaxation and then the complete repeal of the Penal Laws, and was a co-founder of the first Catholic Committee in 1757, along with his friend Dr. John Curry and Mr. Wyse of Waterford. In 1788 he became a member of the Royal Irish Academy.

His collection of manuscripts and manuscript copies, annotated with his copious notes and comments, made up the first part of the Annals of the Four Masters (originally the property of Fearghal Ó Gadhra) that were collected at the Stowe Library, and at that time many of them were the only copies known to exist.

Early life
Charles O'Conor was born in 1710, in County Sligo, to a cadet branch of the land-owning family of O'Conor Don and was sent for his education to Father Walter Skelton's school in Dublin. He grew up in an environment that celebrated Gaelic culture and heritage. He began collecting and studying ancient manuscripts at an early age.

His marriage brought him financial stability so that he could devote himself to his writing, but he was widowed in 1750, within a year of his father's death. When his eldest son Denis married in 1760, he gave up the residence at Bellanagare to him and moved into a small cottage that he had built on the estate. He would devote the remainder of his life to the collection and study of Irish manuscripts, to the publication of dissertations, and especially to the cause of Irish and Catholic emancipation.

In the 1749 census of the Diocese of Elphin, O'Conor was listed as having 4 servants in Bellanagare and 5 couples living on his land who also worked as servants.

Professional life
O'Conor was well known in Ireland from his youth, as a civil-tongued, but adamant advocate of Gaelic culture and history, who had suffered for his adherence to the Roman Catholic faith. He was profoundly knowledgeable about Irish culture and history.

He garnered fame outside Ireland through his Dissertations on the ancient history of Ireland (1753). Like all of his works, his account was everywhere consistent with the historical record. The book was generally well received, and when Samuel Johnson was made aware of it, he was moved to write a letter to O'Conor in 1755, complimenting the book, complimenting the Irish people, and urging O'Conor to write on the topic of Celtic languages.

The book was less well received in some Scottish circles, where there existed a movement to write Celtic history based upon Scottish origins. When James Macpherson published a spurious story in 1761 that he had found an ancient Gaelic (and Scottish) cycle of poems by a certain "Ossian", among the critics who rejected it as false was O'Conor, as an inclusion (Remarks on Mr. Mac Pherson's translation of Fingal and Temora) in the 1766 rewrite of his 1753 work. While the issue was laid to public rest by others (notably Samuel Johnson), the issue was laid to intellectual rest by O'Conor in 1775, with the publication of his Dissertation on the origin and antiquities of the antient Scots. That the issue occurred provided O'Conor the opportunity to establish Ireland as the source of Gaelic culture in the minds of the non-Irish general public.

O'Conor's later life was that of the respected dean of Irish historians. He continued to write as he had always done, in favour of ideas that he himself favoured and were consistent with the historical record, and against any and all ideas that were inconsistent with the historical record, including those of other Irish historians. Such was his esteemed reputation that even those whom he challenged would include his challenges in the next edition of their own books. He would continue to collect, study, and annotate Irish manuscripts, and when he died, his collection became the first part of the Annals of the Four Masters at the Stowe Library. In 1883 these were returned to the Royal Irish Academy library.

In 1766 he was introduced by Edmund Burke to the Revd. Thomas Leland at Trinity College Dublin, and was using its library and meeting its Provost from 1767.

His unfinished History of Ireland, that Johnson had encouraged in 1777, was destroyed on his instructions at his death.

In his Tour in Ireland (1780) Arthur Young mentioned his visit to O'Conor: 
At Clonells, near Castlerea, lives O’Connor, the direct descendant of Roderick O’Connor, who was king of Connaught six or seven hundred years ago; there is a monument of him in Roscommon Church, with his sceptre, etc.  I was told as a certainty that this family were here long before the coming of the Milesians.  Their possessions, formerly so great, are reduced to three or four hundred pounds a year, the family having fared in the revolutions of so many ages much worse than the O’Niels and O’Briens.  The common people pay him the greatest respect, and send him presents of cattle, etc., upon various occasions.  They consider him as the prince of a people involved in one common ruin.

Legacy
His legacy in modern history is succinct. Though the effort was promoted by many, it was largely through his effectiveness that Ireland received the recognition that it deserved as the font of Gaelic culture and the premier disseminator of literacy in ancient times. O'Conor also strove for the presentation of Celtic Christianity as something separate from early Roman Catholicism as a means of allaying Protestant British distrust of the Catholic Irish, a perspective that has survived into modern times. 

O'Conor's support for the first Catholic Committees from 1758 was copied nationwide, resulting in the successful, but slow, repeal of most of the Irish penal laws in 1774-1793.

An account of his life, "Memoirs of the life and writings of the late Charles O'Conor of Belanagare", was written by his grandson, Charles O'Conor. Another grandson Matthew O'Conor, also became a historian and used papers collected by his grandfather to write "The History of Irish Catholics from the Settlement in 1691". Another grandson  Owen O'Conor became O'Conor Don in 1820. A prominent supporter of Catholic Emancipation and was a close associate of Daniel O'Connell and the first catholic member of parliament for Roscommon since before the penal laws.

Partial bibliography
Among O'Conor's principal works are:
 Dissertations on the ancient history of Ireland (1753)
 Principles of the Roman Catholics (1756)
 Introduction to Dr. Curry's Civil Wars (1756)
 The Protestant Interest of Ireland considered (1757)
 Dissertations on the ancient history of Ireland. To which is subjoined, a dissertation on the Irish colonies established in Britain. With some remarks on Mr. Mac Pherson's translation of Fingal and Temora. (1766)
 A dissertation on the origin and antiquities of the antient Scots, and notes, critical and explanatory, on Mr. O'Flaherty's text – included in The Ogygia vindicated: against the objections of Sir George Mackenzie, king's advocate for Scotland in the reign of king James II, by Roderic O'Flaherty (1775)
 On the Heathen State and Topography of Ancient Ireland (1783)

See also

 Tadhg Og Ó Cianáin
 Peregrine Ó Duibhgeannain
 Lughaidh Ó Cléirigh
 Mícheál Ó Cléirigh
 Sylvester O'Halloran
 James Ussher
 Sir James Ware
 Mary Bonaventure Browne
 Dubhaltach Mac Fhirbhisigh
 Ruaidhrí Ó Flaithbheartaigh
 Uilliam Ó Duinnín
 Eugene O'Curry
 John O'Donovan (scholar)
 James MacLagan
 Bellanagare

Footnotes

Sources

External links
 https://archive.org/stream/irishecclesiast02recogoog#page/n740/mode/2up

1710 births
1791 deaths
Irish antiquarians
Irish genealogists
18th-century Irish historians
Members of the Royal Irish Academy
People from County Roscommon
People from County Sligo
18th-century Irish male writers
Charles